Fútbol de Primera is an American radio network covering soccer. It is the home of the most exclusive soccer radio rights in the country. It has broadcast the World Cup since 2002, including the most recent 2022 FIFA World Cup, along with other FIFA tournaments. FDP also broadcasts Mexico's national team games, the CONCACAF Gold Cup, and had broadcast the Copa América in 2015 and 2016.

Fútbol de Primera produces a daily show hosted by Andrés Cantor, which has been running since 1989. Alongside Cantor, the show's personalities are Sammy Sadovnik, Jaime Gallardo, and Rosa Beatriz Sánchez. The show covers a wide range of football highlighting daily events in Mexico, Latin America, and Europe providing in-depth analysis of the most important headlines of the day. They are the longest-running, nationally syndicated Spanish radio program in the country  and can be heard on 115 affiliated stations in the U.S. and others throughout Central and South America. Additionally, the daily program, as well as game broadcasts can be heard globally on the network's official YouTube and Twitch channels.

Fútbol de Primera is based in Miami, but has offices in New York City, San Francisco, and San Antonio. Cantor is also the co-chairman of the network along with Alejandro Gutman.

History

Fútbol de Primera Radio Network was created in August 1989 by Alejandro Gutman taking its first steps in becoming an integral part of the nation's soccer landscape. With vast experience in the soccer world, Fútbol de Primera realized there was a need for soccer to be listened to on a substantial market list of stations that match the quality of the games themselves.  In a historic move, Fútbol de Primera Radio worked with its affiliates to broaden the landscape beyond AM and talk radio to put soccer on the FM dial music formatted stations as soccer specials.  The strategy worked and powerhouse matches over the years have been heard nationally without fail. Fútbol de Primera's most renowned broadcasts include the 2002, 2006, 2010 and 2014 FIFA World Cup. Other broadcasts include the Mexico national team games, CONCACAF World Cup Qualification and a record eight consecutive CONCACAF Gold Cups.

In 1991, Fútbol de Primera created the Fútbol de Primera Player of the Year which for twenty years was sponsored by the American Honda Motor Company. This award recognizes the best United States men's national soccer team player as voted by the U.S. media.

FDP also produces "Casos y Cosas de Collins" a one-hour weekly show hosted by renowned Mexican journalist and author María Antonieta Collins.

Game Broadcasts

Copa Mundial de FIFA (2002-present)
Copa FIFA Confederaciones (2003-present)
CONCACAF FIFA World Cup Qualifiers
Copa Mundial de Futsal de FIFA
Mundial de Clubes de FIFA
CONCACAF Copa Oro
Copa América
Mexico national football team
Copa Africana de Naciones
Copa de la Liga de Inglaterra (EFL Cup)
Copa de Alemania (DFB-Pokal/German Cup)
Juego de la Semana (Spanish: Game of the Week):
 Serie A
 Ligue 1
 Bundesliga

Broadcast Team

Fútbol de Primera has a core broadcast team that is part of the daily show. 
Sammy Sadovnik
Rosa Beatriz Sánchez
Jaime Gallardo
Daniel Chapela
Carlos Aranzamendi (Correspondent in El Salvador)
Enrique "Kike" Lanza (Correspondent in Honduras)
Aldo Lara (Correspondent in Guadalajara)
René Fernández (Correspondent in Monterrey)
Mauricio Acosta (Correspondent in Mexico City)
David Ruiz (Correspondent in Spain)

For World Cups, Fútbol de Primera recruits former soccer players, coaches, and savants to their show. With so many personalities, Fútbol de Primera's show can be considered one of the most knowledgeable panels in Latin American soccer. The following have been a part of Fútbol de Primera's broadcast team at World Cups.

Carlos Valderrama
Bora Milutinović 
Carlos Hermosillo
Manuel Sol
Eduardo de la Torre
Carlos de los Cobos
Steve Sampson
Javier Castrilli
Aníbal "Maño" Ruiz
Edgardo Broner
Eugenio Díaz
Kevin Rodríguez
Ernesto Barrera
Mariano Closs

Stations
The following are the 115 affiliated stations where Fútbol de Primera's broadcasts such as the daily show and matches can be heard

Albuquerque-Santa Fe, New Mexico
 105.9 FM Jose

Atlanta, Georgia
 1600 AM La Mejor
 1460 AM La Mejor
 1130 AM La Mejor

Atlantic City, New Jersey
 97.3 FM WENJ (World Cup and Gold Cup broadcasts only)

Amarillo, Texas
 96.1 FM KBEX La Poderosa
 87.7 FM KBEX-LP La Poderosa
 105.1 FM KAMT-FM

Austin, Texas
 97.1 KTXX-FM HD2 Fiesta FM

Bakersfield, California
 94.9 FM KXTT La Mejor

Barstow, California
 97.5 FM KLYY Jose
 95.9 FM KXXZ El Portal

Baton Rouge, Louisiana
 105.5 FM Tropical

Bend, Oregon
 1240 AM La Bronca

Boise, Idaho
 101.9 FM La Gran D

Chicago, Illinois
 1590 AM WCGO 1590 AM
 107.9 FM La Ley

Colorado Springs-Pueblo, Colorado
 92.1 FM Jose

Dallas-Ft. Worth, Texas
 87.7 FM La Mexicana

Denver-Boulder, Colorado
 92.1 FM Jose
 1150 AM Onda 1150

El Centro-Yuma, California
 94.5 FM Jose

El Paso, Texas
 94.7 FM KYSE El Gato
 1650 AM KSVE Jose

Eugene, Oregon
 880 AM La Campeona

Fayetteville, Arkansas
 95.7 FM La Zeta

Fresno-Visalia, California
 1600 AM KGST 1600 AM
 101.9 FM KLBN
 107.1 FM KHIT-FM

Greensboro, North Carolina
 1590 AM Que Pasa Radio
 1380 AM Que Pasa Radio
 1040 AM Que Pasa Radio

Greenville, South Carolina
 1260 AM WPJF 1260 AM
 1580 AM La Poderosa

Hartford-New Haven, Connecticut
 840 AM La Gigante

Houston-Galveston, Texas
 850 AM KEYH La Ranchera
 96.9 FM La Bonita

Indianapolis, Indiana
 810 AM La Joya 810 AM
 107.1 FM Radio Latina

Knoxville, Tennessee
 93.5 FM La Lider 93.5

Lakeland, Florida
 1460 AM La X

Las Vegas, Nevada
 92.7 FM Maria

Lillington, North Carolina
 1370 AM WLLN 1370 AM

Little Rock, Arkansas
 106.3 FM La Zeta

Los Angeles, California
 97.5 FM KLYY Jose
 103.1 FM KDLD El Gato

Lubbock, Texas
 1460 AM KBZO Jose

McAllen-Brownsville, Texas
 101.1 FM KNVO-FM Jose

Memphis, Tennessee
 1030 AM Radio Ambiente Caliente

Miami-Ft. Lauderdale, Florida
 1020 AM Actualidad 1020

Minneapolis, Minnesota
 1530 AM La Picosa

Monett, Missouri
 97.7 FM La M Grande

Nashville, Tennessee
 1240 AM Activa

New Orleans, Louisiana
 1540 AM-105.7 FM Tropical

New York, New York/Paterson, New Jersey
 WKDM 1380 (New York City)
 WPAT 930 (Paterson, New Jersey)
 WPAT-FM 93.1 Amor 93 (Paterson, New Jersey)

Oklahoma City, Oklahoma
 1460 AM La Tremenda

Orlando-Daytona Beach, Florida
 1340 AM Onda Mexicana

Oxnard, California
 910 AM KOXR La Mexicana

Palm Springs, California
 97.5 FM KLYY Jose
 94.7 FM KLOB Jose

Philadelphia, Pennsylvania
 1590 AM

Phoenix, Arizona
 710 AM KBMB
 107.1 FM KVVA-FM Jose
 106.9 FM KDVA Jose
 1190 AM KNUV Onda 1190

Ponce, Puerto Rico
 WPAB 550 AM

Portland, Oregon
 880 AM La Campeona

Raleigh-Durham, North Carolina
 1310 AM La Mega

Rankin, Texas
 93.7 FM KXFS

Reidsville, North Carolina
 1220 AM Que Pasa Radio

Reno, Nevada
 102.1 FM Tricolor

Richmond, Virginia
 1480 AM La X
 1320 AM Selecta 1320

Sacto-Stockton-Modesto, California
 104.3 FM KXSE Jose
 97.1 FM KTSE-FM Jose
 1690 AM KFSG

Saint George, Utah
 101.1 FM Stereo Unica

Salinas, Monterey, Santa Cruz, California
 107.1 FM Jose

Salt Lake City-Ogden-Provo, Utah
 1600 AM KTUB Juan

San Diego, California
 1040 AM

San Francisco-San Jose, California
 93.3 FM KRZZ La Raza
 1370 AM KZSF La Kaliente

Sta Barbara, California
 1250 AM KZER Radio Lazer

Santa Maria, California
 1480 AM KSBQ La Mexicana

Santa Rosa, California
 104.1 FM KJOR La Mejor

Seattle-Tacoma, Washington
 1210 AM Latino

Tampa-St Petersburg, Florida
 1550 AM La Ley

Tucson, Arizona
 990 AM KTKT 990 AM

Twin Falls, Idaho
 970 AM La Fantastica

Vineland, New Jersey
 1440 AM Radio Exitos

Washington, DC
 87.7 FM La Nueva
 900 AM "America 900" (during World Cup 2018)

West Palm Beach, Florida
 1040 AM Actualidad

Yakima, Washington
 96.9 FM-97.9 FM-95.9 FM La Gran D

References

External links
 Official site 
 

Spanish-language radio in the United States
Soccer mass media in the United States